Carex curaica is a tussock-forming species of perennial sedge in the family Cyperaceae. It is native to parts of northern and central Asia.

See also
List of Carex species

References

curaica
Plants described in 1837
Taxa named by Carl Sigismund Kunth
Flora of Kazakhstan
Flora of Kyrgyzstan
Flora of Tajikistan
Flora of Pakistan
Flora of Mongolia
Flora of Siberia
Flora of Xinjiang